Almeria is a genus of moths in the family Geometridae.

Species
 Almeria dentata
 Almeria kalischata (Staudinger, 1870)
 Almeria rubrotincta

References
 Almeria at Markku Savela's Lepidoptera and some other life forms

Cidariini
Geometridae genera